The 1989 Guarujá Open was a men's tennis tournament held in Guarujá in Brazil and played on outdoor clay courts. It was part of the 1989 Nabisco Grand Prix. The tournament took place from 6 February through 13 February 1989. First-seeded Luiz Mattar won his second consecutive singles title at the event.

Finals

Singles

 Luiz Mattar defeated  Jimmy Brown 7–6, 6–4
 It was Mattar's 1st title of the year and the 5th of his career.

Doubles

 Ricardo Acioly /  Dacio Campos defeated  César Kist /  Mauro Menezes 7–6, 7–6
 It was Acioly's only title of the year and the 3rd of his career. It was Campos' only title of the year and the 1st of his career.

References

Guaruja Open
Guarujá Open